St Helens or St. Helen's may refer to:

Places

Australia
 St Helens, Queensland (Fraser Coast Region), a locality in the Fraser Coast Region
 St Helens, Queensland (Toowoomba Region), a locality in the Toowoomba Region
 St Helens Beach, Queensland a locality in the Mackay Region
 St Helens, Tasmania
 St Helens Island
 St Helens Airport
 St Helens Important Bird Area
 St Helens, Victoria

United Kingdom
 St Helens, Merseyside, England
 Metropolitan Borough of St Helens
 St Helens Central railway station
 St Helens Junction railway station
 St Helen's, Isles of Scilly, an uninhabited island in the Isles of Scilly, Cornwall
 St Helens, Cumbria, a location in England
 St Helens, Isle of Wight, England, a village
 St Helens, East Sussex, England
 St Helen's (London), a parish in Bishopsgate, London, England
 St Helen's Church, Bishopsgate, an Evangelical Anglican church in London, England
 St. Helen's (skyscraper), a building in the City of London
 St Helen's, South Yorkshire, a location in England
 St Helen Auckland, also known as St. Helen's Auckland, a village in County Durham
 Church of St Helen, St Helen Auckland, Anglican church
 St Helens railway station (disambiguation), some of which were in or near St Helens, Merseyside

United States
 Mount St. Helens, an active stratovolcano in Washington
 Saint Helens, Kentucky
 Shively, Kentucky, formerly known as Saint Helens
 St. Helens, Oregon, city and county seat
 , unincorporated community

Elsewhere
 St. Helens, Ontario, Canada
 St. Helen's, Booterstown, Ireland

Sports
 St Helens R.F.C., Merseyside rugby league football club
 St Helens Town A.F.C., Merseyside association football club
 F.C. St Helens, Merseyside association football club
 St Helens & District Football Combination, Merseyside association football league
 St. Helen's Rugby and Cricket Ground, Swansea, Wales

Other uses
 St Helen and St Katharine, an independent school in southern England, also known as St Helen's
 St Helen's School, an independent girls school in Northwood, England
 Baron St Helens, a British peerage title
 Alleyne Fitzherbert, 1st Baron St Helens
 St. Helens (film), a 1981 film directed by Ernest Pintoff

See also
 Helena (empress), or Saint Helena
 Saint Elen, or Saint Helen
 Saint Helena (disambiguation)
 Sainte-Hélène (disambiguation)
 Santa Helena (disambiguation)
 St. Helen (disambiguation)